Michael Guy Attridge, known as Gus Attridge is a South African businessman. He is the deputy CEO of Aspen Pharmacare, which he co-founded with Stephen Saad in 1997. In 2013 Attridge's 4% personal stake in the company was valued at over $320 million.

References

Living people
South African businesspeople
Businesspeople in the pharmaceutical industry
Year of birth missing (living people)
Alumni of Northwood School, Durban